The 2017–18 OK Liga Femenina was the 10th season of the top-tier league of women's rink hockey in Spain. It started on 14 October 2017 and finished on 26 May 2018.

Hostelcur Gijón repeated as champion and achieved their third title overall.

Teams
Vila-sana promoted as champion of the Nacional Catalana. Due to the resigns to promote of Borbolla and Coslada, Citylift Girona and Reus Deportiu occupied their places as second and third qualified teams of the Nacional Catalana.

League table

Results

Top goalscorers

Copa de la Reina

The 2018 Copa de la Reina  was the 13th edition of the Spanish women's roller hockey cup. It was played at the Pavelló d'Esports of Vilanova i la Geltrú between 2 and 4 March 2018.

The competition that will be played by the seven first qualified teams at the end of the first half of the league and Calmar Vilanova as host team. 

Calmar Vilanova won their second title, nine years after their first one.

Bracket

Source: FEP.es

References

External links
Real Federación Española de Patinaje

OK Liga Femenina seasons
2017 in roller hockey
2018 in roller hockey
2017 in Spanish sport
2018 in Spanish sport